Red Square is a city square in Moscow.

Red Square or Redsquare may also refer to:

Places
 Red Square (Oriental Plaza), a former public square in Fordsburg, South Africa
 Red Square (University of Washington), an open square on campus, Seattle, Washington, U.S.
 Red Square (restaurant), a Soviet-themed restaurant/bar in Las Vegas, Nevada, and in Atlantic City, New Jersey, U.S.
 Red Square (Cheboksary), a city square, site of the Chuvash National Museum, in Cheboksary, Russia
 Red Square, the name of Alexander Nevsky Square between 1923 and 1952
 Red Square, a location on the campus of Georgetown University, Washington, D.C., U.S.
 Red Square, a location on the campus of Georgetown University in Qatar, Qatar.
 Red Square, a location on the campus of The Evergreen State College, Olympia, Washington, U.S.
 Red Square, a location on the campus of Salisbury University, Salisbury, Maryland, U.S.

Other uses
 Red Square (band), a 1970s English band
 Red Square (novel), a novel by Martin Cruz Smith
 Red Square (painting), a painting by Kazimir Malevich
 Red Square Nebula, a celestial object
 The solidarity symbol used during the 2005 and 2012 Quebec student protests
 Redsquare, the name of a South Korean girl group